Israel Héctor Enrique Perez (born April 21, 1979 in Buenos Aires) is a featherweight boxer from Argentina, who represented his native country at the 2000 Summer Olympics in Sydney, Australia.

Boxing career

Nicknamed "Cachito" he made his professional debut in 2003. He won eight professional bouts in a row, before being losing by split decision to John Nolasco of the Dominican Republic. As of November 2006, Perez had compiled a record of 17-2 (10 KO).

Professional boxing record 

|-
| style="text-align:center;" colspan="8"|27 Wins (16 knockouts), 2 Loss, 1 Draws
|-  style="text-align:center; background:#e3e3e3;"
|  style="border-style:none none solid solid; "|Res.
|  style="border-style:none none solid solid; "|Record
|  style="border-style:none none solid solid; "|Opponent
|  style="border-style:none none solid solid; "|Type
|  style="border-style:none none solid solid; "|Rd.,Time
|  style="border-style:none none solid solid; "|Date
|  style="border-style:none none solid solid; "|Location
|  style="border-style:none none solid solid; "|Notes
|- align=center
|Win||27–3–1||align=left| Takashi Uchiyama
|
|
|
|align=left|
|align=left|
|- align=center
|Win||27–2–1||align=left| Carlos Ricardo Rodriguez
|
|
|
|align=left|
|align=left|
|- align=center
|Win||26–2–1||align=left| Francisco Lorenzo
|
|
|
|align=left|
|align=left|
|- align=center
|Win||25–2–1||align=left| Diego Herminio Sananco
|
|
|
|align=left|
|align=left|
|- align=center
|Win||24–2–1||align=left| Orlen Padilla
|
|
|
|align=left|
|align=left|
|- align=center
|Draw||23–2–1||align=left| Miguel Leonardo Caceres
|
|
|
|align=left|
|align=left|
|- align=center
|Win||23–2||align=left| Alberto Leopoldo Santillan
|
|
|
|align=left|
|align=left|
|- align=center
|Win||22–2||align=left| Daniel Souza Santos
|
|
|
|align=left|
|align=left|
|- align=center
|Win||21–2||align=left| Hugo Orlando Fernandez
|
|
|
|align=left|
|align=left|
|- align=center
|Win||20–2||align=left| Rene Gonzalez
|
|
|
|align=left|
|align=left|
|- align=center
|Win||19–2||align=left| Hugo Orlando Fernandez
|
|
|
|align=left|
|align=left|
|- align=center
|Win||18–2||align=left| Fabian Valentin Martinez
|
|
|
|align=left|
|align=left|
|- align=center
|Win||17–2||align=left| Sergio Daniel Ledesma
|
|
|
|align=left|
|align=left|
|- align=center
|Win||16–2||align=left| Miguel Angel Albarado
|
|
|
|align=left|
|align=left|
|- align=center
|Win||15–2||align=left| Vicente Luis Burgo
|
|
|
|align=left|
|align=left|

External links
 

1979 births
Living people
Featherweight boxers
Boxers at the 2000 Summer Olympics
Olympic boxers of Argentina
Boxers from Buenos Aires
Argentine male boxers